{{DISPLAYTITLE:Delta1 Gruis}}

Delta1 Gruis, Latinized from δ1 Gruis, is a candidate binary star system in the constellation Grus. With a peak apparent visual magnitude of 3.97, it is bright enough to be seen with the naked eye at night. The distance to this system, as determined using an annual parallax shift of 10.54 mas as seen from the Earth, is around 309 light years. It is gradually moving away from the Sun with a radial velocity of +4.9 km/s.

The brighter component of this system is an evolved, yellow-hued, G-type giant star with a stellar classification of G6/8 III. It is a semiregular variable that ranges between apparent magnitudes 3.99 and 4.2, located 325 light-years from Earth. Delta1 Gruis has around 3 times the mass and 135 times the diameter of the Sun. The fainter companion is a magnitude 12.8 star at an angular separation of 5.6 arc seconds, as of 2008.

References

G-type giants
Grus (constellation)
Gruis, Delta1
Durchmusterung objects
213009
110997
8556